Sepp Paar (6 March 1913 – 21 September 1997) was a German wrestler. He competed in the men's freestyle welterweight at the 1936 Summer Olympics.

References

1913 births
1997 deaths
German male sport wrestlers
Olympic wrestlers of Germany
Wrestlers at the 1936 Summer Olympics